Rama Krishna may refer to:
 Ramakrishna (2004 Kannada film), a 2004 Kannada film
 Ramakrishna (2004 Tamil film), a 2004 Tamil film
 Ramakrishna, an Indian Hindu mystic and religious leader who lived in the 19th century.